This page lists notable people with the surname (that is, family name) Matthews.

For a list of notable people with the surname Matthew (without -s), see Matthew (surname).

For a list of notable people with the surname Mathews (with only one "t"), see Mathews (surname).

For a list of notable people with the forename (that is, given name) Matthew, see Matthew (name).

For the etymology of the name Matthew and for cognates (related forenames and surnames), see Matthew (name).

Matthews is a surname derived from the forename Matthew.

Geographical distribution
As of 2014, 53.6% of all known bearers of the surname Matthews were residents of the United States (frequency 1:2,136), 19.2% of England (1:917), 8.1% of Australia (1:932), 4.9% of South Africa (1:3,498), 4.8% of Canada (1:2,425), 2.0% of Wales (1:492), 1.1% of New Zealand (1:1,251), 1.0% of the Republic of Ireland (1:1,445) and 1.0% of Jamaica (1:908).

In Wales, the frequency of the surname was higher than average (1:492) in the following principal areas:
 1. Caerphilly County Borough (1:229)
 2. Torfaen (1:278)
 3. Bridgend County Borough (1:306)
 4. Swansea (1:384)
 5. Wrexham County Borough (1:399)
 6. Monmouthshire (1:400)
 7. Neath Port Talbot (1:423)
 8. Rhondda Cynon Taf (1:447)
 9. Vale of Glamorgan (1:465)
 10. Merthyr Tydfil County Borough (1:465)
 11. Blaenau Gwent (1:488)

In England, the frequency of the surname was higher than average (1:917) in the following unitary authority districts:

 1. Cornwall (1:376)
 2. Herefordshire (1:385)
 3. Staffordshire (1:557)
 4. Wiltshire (1:561)
 5. Isle of Wight (1:569)
 6. Gloucestershire (1:599)
 7. Dorset (1:615)
 8. Shropshire (1:623)
 9. Devon (1:626)
 10. Hampshire (1:627)
 11. West Sussex (1:642)
 12. Rutland (1:654)
 13. Oxfordshire (1:670)
 14. Worcestershire (1:680)
 15. Norfolk (1:713)
 16. Bristol (1:715)
 17. Surrey (1:737)
 18. Somerset (1:760)
 19. East Sussex (1:760)
 20. Cambridgeshire (1:777)
 21. Kent (1:801)
 22. Warwickshire (1:820)
 23. Essex (1:825)
 24. Nottinghamshire (1:850)
 25. West Midlands (1:859)
 26. Suffolk (1:860)
 27. Berkshire (1:867)
 28. Bedfordshire (1:882)
 29. Hertfordshire (1:890)
 30. Buckinghamshire (1:896)

In the United States, the frequency of the surname was higher than average (1:2,136) in the following states:

 1. North Carolina (1:907)
 2. Maryland (1:971)
 3. Louisiana (1:1,014)
 4. South Carolina (1:1,090)
 5. Delaware (1:1,168)
 6. Mississippi (1:1,209)
 7. Alabama (1:1,244)
 8. Tennessee (1:1,336)
 9. Arkansas (1:1,400)
 10. Virginia (1:1,656)
 11. Oklahoma (1:1,657)
 12. Washington, D.C. (1:1,660)
 13. Georgia (1:1,786)
 14. Idaho (1:1,945)
 15. Texas (1:1,989)
 16. Michigan (1:2,094)

Art, design, media, and literature
 A. E. Matthews, English actor
 Barbara Winifred Matthews (1917–1997), New Zealand gardening writer and horticulturist
 Brett Matthews, American writer of comics and TV shows
 Chris Matthews, American television talk show host
 Dakin Matthews, American actor
 Francis Matthews (actor), English film, TV and stage actor 
 Herbert Matthews, reporter for the New York Times
 James Brander Matthews (1852–1929), American writer and educator
 James William Matthews (1895–1982), New Zealand newspaper editor, gardening writer, and magazine founder
 Janet Matthews, Australian artist
 Jared Matthews American Ballet Theatre soloist
 Jeffery Matthews, British postage stamp designer
 Kathleen Matthews, anchor for ABC 7 News/ WJLA-TV in Washington, D.C.
 Kevin Matthews (radio personality), Midwest-based radio personality
 Lester Matthews, English actor
 Liesel Matthews, American heiress, socialite, and actress
 Mariana Matthews (born 1946), Chilean photographer
 Rodney Matthews, English fantasy artist and illustrator
 Sally Ann Matthews, English actress known for roles in British soap operas
 Tina Matthews (born 1961), New Zealand author, illustrator, and puppetmaker
 William Matthews (poet), American poet and essayist

Business and invention
 Bernard Matthews, founder of a food processing company
 Christopher Matthews (businessman), British businessman
 Gordon Matthews (inventor), American inventor and businessman
 Harry Grindell Matthews (1880–1941), English inventor
 Terry Matthews, Welsh/Canadian high tech entrepreneur
 Victor Matthews, Baron Matthews, British businessman

Military
 Al Matthews (actor) (born 1942), member of the U.S. Marine Corps and actor
 Bruce Matthews (General), commander of the 2nd Canadian Infantry Division in World War II
 Francis P. Matthews (1887–1952), 49th U.S. Secretary of the Navy
 H. Spencer Matthews, (1921–2002), first U.S. naval pilot to be promoted to admiral
 Mark Matthews (1894–2005), former Buffalo Soldier in the U.S. Army
 Peter Matthews (rebel) (c.1790–1838), farmer and soldier who participated in the Upper Canada Rebellion of 1837
 Saul Matthews, African-American American Revolutionary War hero

Music
 Andrew Matthews-Owen, Welsh pianist
 Artie Matthews (1888–1958), American ragtime composer
 Ben Matthews (musician), English guitarist and keyboard player with the band Thunder
 Ceri Rhys Matthews (born 1960) Welsh traditional musician
 Cerys Matthews (born 1969), Welsh singer
 Colin Matthews (born 1946), English composer
 Dave Matthews (born 1967), South African musician
 David Matthews (composer) (born 1943), English composer
 Denise Katrina Matthews, known as Vanity (1959–2016), Canadian singer, actress, and religious leader
 Edward Matthews (singer), pioneering African-American opera singer
 Emma Matthews (born 1970), Australian operatic soprano
 Iain Matthews, English musician and songwriter
 Jessie Matthews, popular English actress, dancer, and singer of the 1930s
 Julie Matthews (born 1963), English singer-songwriter
 Krissy Matthews (born 1992), British-Norwegian blues rock singer-songwriter and guitarist.
 Lee Matthews (singer) (born 1988), Irish singer songwriter, formerly Lee Mulhern
 Neal Matthews, Jr., American singer
 Patrick Matthews, former bassist of Australian band The Vines
 Raymond Matthews, member of the American country music group Matthews, Wright & King
 Ron Matthews, original drummer for English band Iron Maiden
 Scott Matthews, English singer-songwriter from Wolverhampton
 Wendy Matthews, Canadian adult alternative pop singer

Politics
 Albert Edward Matthews, Lieutenant Governor of Ontario
Allen S. Matthews, American merchant and politician
 Asa C. Matthews, American politician
 Bill Matthews, Canadian politician
 Claude Matthews, governor of the U.S. state of Indiana from 1893 to 1897
 Charles Matthews (Texas politician), former member of the Texas Railroad Commission
 Deb Matthews, politician in Ontario, Canada
 Francis P. Matthews (1887–1952), U.S. Secretary of the Navy
 Gabriel Baccus Matthews, Liberian politician
 Gary Matthews (politician), Speaker of the Montana House of Representatives
 Henry Matthews, 1st Viscount Llandaff, British Conservative politician and statesman
 Jim Matthews (politician), public official in Pennsylvania
 John H. Matthews, Canadian politician
 Joseph W. Matthews, Governor of Mississippi from 1848 to 1850
 Michael J. Matthews (1934–2014), American mayor
 Norman Derek Matthews, OBE (1922–1976), British colonial administrator and diplomat
 Philip Bushill-Matthews, British politician and Member of the European Parliament
 Print Matthews, Reconstruction-era social organizer murdered while voting
 Robert Charles Matthews, Canadian politician
 Stanley Matthews (judge), Republican politician and jurist from Ohio
 William Matthews (politician), American politician

Sciences
 Andrew Matthews (entomologist) (1815–1897), British clergyman and entomologist 
 Drummond Matthews (1931–1997), English marine geologist and geophysicist
 James Robert Matthews (1889–1978), Scottish botanist
 Jaymie Matthews (born 1958), Canadian astrophysicist
 Mabel Lucy Matthews (25 May 1879 – c. 1970) British electrical and production engineer
 Paul Taunton Matthews, (1919–1987) British theoretical physicist
 William Matthews (engineer), British civil engineer
 Zachariah Keodirelang Matthews (1901-1968), Tswana South African anthropologist

Sports
 A.J. Matthews (born 1988), American mixed martial artist
 Adam Matthews, Welsh footballer 
 Al Matthews (American football) (born 1947), professional football player
 Austin Matthews, cricketer who played for Northamptonshire, Glamorgan and England
 Auston Matthews (born 1997), American ice hockey player for the Toronto Maple Leafs
 Brenda Matthews, New Zealand sprinter
 Charles Matthews (basketball) (born 1996), American basketball player
 Christopher Matthews (cricketer), former Australian cricketer 
 Craig Matthews, South African cricketer 
 Darren Matthews (born 1968), English professional wrestler better known as William Regal
 Denny Matthews, American sportscaster
 Don Matthews, head coach in the Canadian Football League
 Gary Matthews, outfielder in Major League Baseball
 Gary Matthews, Jr., Major League Baseball player with the Los Angeles Angels of Anaheim
 Greg Matthews, New South Wales and Australian cricketer
 H. L. Matthews (1889–1975), American college sports coach and patriarch of the American football family listed below                                                 
 Hayley Matthews West Indies cricket player
 Hannah Matthews, Irish field hockey player
 Helen Matthews, Scottish footballer and suffragette
 Jimmy Matthews, Australian Test cricketer
 Ken Matthews (1934–2019), English race walker
 Lee Matthews (footballer), English football (soccer) player
 Leigh Matthews, Australian Rules football player
 Michael Matthews (cyclist), Australian cyclist
 Mickey Matthews, head football coach at James Madison University
 Mike Matthews (born 1973), Major League Baseball pitcher 
 Morgan Matthews (figure skater), American figure skater
 Robert William Matthews, Welsh footballer
 Shane Matthews, quarterback in the National Football League
 Stanley Matthews (1915–2000), English footballer
 Todd Matthews-Jouda, hurdling athlete
 Vincent Matthews (athlete) (born 1947), American athlete
 Will Matthews (rugby union), rugby union footballer
 William Clarence Matthews (1877–1928), baseball player and political activist.
 A family of American football players descended from H. L. Matthews:
 First generation:
 Clay Matthews Sr. (1928–2017), offensive lineman (son of H. L.)
 Second generation (both sons of Clay Sr.):
 Clay Matthews Jr. (born 1956), linebacker
 Bruce Matthews (American football) (born 1961), offensive lineman and coach
 Third generation:
 Clay Matthews III (born 1986), linebacker (son of Clay Jr.)
 Kevin Matthews (American football) (born 1987), offensive lineman (son of Bruce)
 Casey Matthews (born 1989), linebacker (son of Clay Jr.)
 Jake Matthews (born 1992), offensive lineman (son of Bruce)

Other
 Barry Matthews, chief executive of the New Zealand Department of Corrections
 Frank Matthews (born 1944), drug trafficker
 James M. Matthews, first chancellor of New York University
 James Tilly Matthews (1770–1815), London tea merchant and schizophrenia sufferer
 Ken Matthews (public servant), Australian public servant
 Leigh Matthews, South African university student who was kidnapped and murdered in 2004: see Murder of Leigh Matthews
 Lisa Matthews, 1991 playmate of the year
 Peter Matthews (linguist), British linguist
 Peter H. Matthews (1873–1916), operator of policy games in New York City
 Robert Matthews (religious figure) (1778–1841), American religious figure 
 Victoria Matthews, Canadian Anglican bishop
 Warren W. Matthews Jr. (born 1939), American jurist
 William Matthews (priest) (1770–1854), American Catholic priest and president of Georgetown College
 Shannon Matthews, British child who disappeared in 2008: see Kidnapping of Shannon Matthews

Fictional characters
 Aspen Matthews, main character of Fathom
Cathy Matthews, from the British soap opera Coronation Street
 Cory Matthews, main character on Boy Meets World
 Courtney Matthews, character on the ABC soap opera General Hospital
 Dave Matthews (Family Affairs), fictional character in U.K. soap opera Family Affairs
 Duncan Matthews, fictional character on the animated TV show X-Men: Evolution
 Eric Matthews (Saw), fictional character of film series Saw
 Grant Matthews, the main character in State of the Union 
 Holden Matthews, the main character in the TV series Beyond
 Josh Matthews (Family Affairs), fictional character in U.K. soap opera Family Affairs
 Paige Matthews, fictional character
 Riley Matthews, the main character on Girl Meets World

See also
 Mathew (surname)
 Matthew (given name)
 Matthew (name)
 Matthew (surname)
 Mathews (surname)

References

English-language surnames